Ursuline Academy Ilford is a Roman Catholic secondary school and sixth form for girls in Ilford, London, England.

The school was established by the Ursulines as Ilford Ursuline High School in 1903. It converted to academy status in 2011 and is administered by the Roman Catholic Diocese of Brentwood.

Notable former pupils
Eileen Ash ( Whelan), Test cricketer
Celia Green, philosopher and author.
Kathy Kirby singer.

References

External links
Ursuline Academy Ilford official website

Secondary schools in the London Borough of Redbridge
Catholic secondary schools in the Diocese of Brentwood
Ursuline schools
Girls' schools in London
Educational institutions established in 1903
1903 establishments in England
Academies in the London Borough of Redbridge
Ilford